Jostein Nordmoe (23 January 1895 – 1965) was a Canadian skier. He competed in the Nordic combined event at the 1932 Winter Olympics.

References

External links
 

1895 births
1965 deaths
Canadian male Nordic combined skiers
Olympic Nordic combined skiers of Canada
Nordic combined skiers at the 1932 Winter Olympics
People from Målselv